Gregory Lip is a clinical researcher and Price-Evans Chair of Cardiovascular Medicine, at the University of Liverpool. He is Director of the Liverpool Centre for Cardiovascular Science at the University of Liverpool, Liverpool John Moores University and Liverpool Heart & Chest Hospital.  

He is also Distinguished Professor at Aalborg University, Denmark; Adjunct Professor at Yonsei University and Seoul National University, Seoul, Korea.  He also holds Visiting or Honorary Professorships in various other Universities in UK, Serbia (Belgrade), China (Beijing, Nanjing, Guangzhou), Thailand (Chiangmai) and Taiwan (Taipei).

He is one of the top highly-cited researchers (h>100) according to webometrics.

Links: 
Liverpool Centre for Cardiovascular Science

Google scholar profile

Publications on PubMed

AD Scientific Index Rankings

References 

Living people
Cardiologists
Academics of the University of Liverpool
1964 births